Maciej Sulęcki (born 2 May 1989) is a Polish professional boxer who challenged for the WBO middleweight title in 2019.

Amateur career 
Sulecki had a 110–30 record as an amateur, becoming a three-time Polish Junior champion.

Professional career 
Sulęcki made his professional debut in June 2010, defeating Adam Gawlik by knockout in the first round in Kielce, Poland. In June 2012, Sulęcki defeated former welterweight world champion Yuriy Nuzhnenko with a unanimous decision.

Over the next three years Sulęcki put together 15 straight victories before fighting for his first title in November 2013, against Lukasz Wawrzyczek for the vacant Republic of Poland middleweight title. Sulęcki won by unanimous decision. In May 2014, he added the Polish International super-middleweight title to that by beating Nicolas Dion of France over ten rounds.

Sulęcki then faced former European champion and WBA middleweight world title challenger Grzegorz Proksa at the Krakow Arena, Poland in November 2014. Sulęcki was victorious in the all-Polish affair, stopping Proksa in the seventh round. Proksa's unorthodox style gave Sulęcki some trouble early on but as the fight went on, Sulęcki started landing more effective shots and ended the fight with a right-hand counterpunch.

Following that victory, the Pole teamed up with promoter Lou DiBella and manager Al Haymon and made his US debut against Darryl Cunningham at the UIC Pavilion, Chicago in April 2015. Sulęcki again won by knockout, this time in the third round.

Sulęcki then stopped 40-year-old Jose Miguel Berrio, late replacement for Eduardo Tercero, at the Prudential Center. Sulęcki landed a number left hooks under the right elbow of Rodriguez and the referee stopped the fight before the end of the first round. Following this victory Sulecki was added as a contender for Sherdog's Top 10 middleweights list.

In 2016, Sulęcki defeated previously unbeaten prospect Hugo Centeno Jr. with a knockout in the final round of a ten-round bout. This was Sulęcki's fifth consecutive knockout after only scoring three stoppages in his first eighteen fights. Sulęcki moved down to light-middleweight in 2017. In October, he fought Jack Culcay, backing up the World Boxing Super Series quarter-final match between Krzysztof Włodarczyk and Murat Gassiev. Sulęcki beat Culcay with a unanimous decision (98-92, 97-93, 96-94).

After that, Sulecki fought former world middleweight champion Daniel Jacobs, who was ranked #2 by the WBA and WBO and #3 by the WBC and IBF at the time. He went on to lose the bout by unanimous decision.

In his next fight in the States, Sulecki defeated Puerto Rican veteran Gabriel Rosado in a grudgematch. This win eventually led him to a #2 ranking by the WBO and a mandatory world-title fight against Demetrius Andrade. Andrade would end up being too much for the Pole, taking away every round from him, while also dropping him to the canvas in the process.

Professional boxing record

References

External links
 
Maciej Sulęcki at PremierBoxingChampions
Maciej Sulęcki – Profile, News Archive & Current Rankings at Box.Live

Living people
1989 births
Polish male boxers
Boxers from Warsaw
Middleweight boxers